The 1920 St. Louis Browns season was a season in American baseball. It involved the Browns finishing 4th in the American League with a record of 76 wins and 77 losses.

Regular season 

The 1920 season belonged to George Sisler. He was the American League batting champion and led all of Major League Baseball with a batting average of .407. This would be 19 points higher than the American League runner-up Tris Speaker, and 37 points higher than the National League batting champion Rogers Hornsby.

Season standings

Record vs. opponents

Roster

Player stats

Batting

Starters by position 
Note: Pos = Position; G = Games played; AB = At bats; H = Hits; Avg. = Batting average; HR = Home runs; RBI = Runs batted in

Other batters 
Note: G = Games played; AB = At bats; H = Hits; Avg. = Batting average; HR = Home runs; RBI = Runs batted in

Pitching

Starting pitchers 
Note: G = Games pitched; IP = Innings pitched; W = Wins; L = Losses; ERA = Earned run average; SO = Strikeouts

Other pitchers 
Note: G = Games pitched; IP = Innings pitched; W = Wins; L = Losses; ERA = Earned run average; SO = Strikeouts

Relief pitchers 
Note: G = Games pitched; W = Wins; L = Losses; SV = Saves; ERA = Earned run average; SO = Strikeouts

Notes

References 
1920 St. Louis Browns team page at Baseball Reference
1920 St. Louis Browns season at baseball-almanac.com

St. Louis Browns seasons
Saint Louis Browns season
St Louis